

x

X-Trozine

xa-xe

Xalatan (Pfizer)
xaliproden (INN)
xamoterol (INN)
Xanax (Pfizer)
xanomeline (INN)
xanoxic acid (INN)
xanthiol (INN)
xantifibrate (INN)
xantinol nicotinate (INN)
xantocillin (INN)
xantofyl palmitate (INN)
Xarelto (Bayer)
Xatral (Sanofi)
Xeloda (Genentech)
Xeloda (Roche)
xemilofiban (INN)
xenalipin (INN)
xenazoic acid (INN)
xenbucin (INN)
Xeneisol
Xenical (Genentech)
xenipentone (INN)
xenon (133 Xe) (INN)
xenthiorate (INN)
xenygloxal (INN)
xenyhexenic acid (INN)
xenysalate (INN)
xenytropium bromide (INN)

xi-xy

xibenolol (INN)
xibornol (INN)
Xifaxan
Xigris
xilobam (INN)
ximelagatran (USAN)
ximoprofen (INN)
xinidamine (INN)
xinomiline (INN)
xipamide (INN)
xipranolol (INN)
Xiral
Xolair
Xopenex
xorphanol (INN)
xylamidine tosilate (INN)
xylazine (INN)
Xylo-Pfan
Xylocaine (Astra AB)
Xylocard
xylocoumarol (INN)
xylofilcon A (USAN))
xylometazoline (INN)
xyloxemine (INN)
Xyrem
Xyzal